RAB GTPase activating protein 1 is a protein in humans that is encoded by the RABGAP1 gene.

References

Further reading